Lazaros Charitonidis (born 18 December 1989) is a Greek footballer.

Career
Charitonidis career began in 2009 at the age of 19 when he signed a professional contract with Panthrakikos.
In summer 2016, he signed with major Greek club Aris Thessaloniki.

Personal life
Charitonidis is married with the Greek triple jumper Paraskevi Papachristou. The couple has a daughter.

Career statistics

Last update: 28 June 2010

References

External links
Profile at epae.org
 Insports
 
 Panthraxstats

1989 births
Living people
Greek footballers
Association football defenders
Panthrakikos F.C. players
OFI Crete F.C. players
Footballers from Komotini